The 2018 Tour Cycliste Féminin International de l'Ardèche is a women's cycle stage race held in France  from 13 September to 18 September, 2018. The tour has an UCI rating of 2.1.

Stages

Classification leadership

References

International cycle races hosted by France
2017 in women's road cycling
2017 in French sport